Rigaud station was a commuter rail station in Rigaud, Quebec, Canada. The station originally opened in 1891, and was eventually served by the AMT Dorion-Rigaud commuter line, with one round trip train per day. In 2010, AMT ended service after Rigaud was unable to pay the annual fee.

Discontinuation of service to Rigaud
Train service was cut to Hudson as of July 1, 2010, as the town of Rigaud was unable to pay the $300,000 annual fee to the AMT to allow service to continue to the town.  Rigaud paid higher rates to the AMT and received less service than other stations, as it is not part of the Montreal Metropolitan Community. Up until that date, the Rigaud station had continuous railroad service since the original Canadian Pacific station opened in 1891.

Following the closure of Rigaud station, the line was renamed the Vaudreuil-Hudson Line.

References

External links
 AMT Website - French only
 Rigaud Station (Pictures)

Former Exo commuter rail stations
Railway stations in Canada opened in 1891
Railway stations closed in 2010
Railway stations in Montérégie
Disused railway stations in Canada
Rail transport in Vaudreuil-Soulanges Regional County Municipality